The Department of Egyptian Antiquities of the Louvre (French: Département des Antiquités égyptiennes du Louvre) is a department of the Louvre that is responsible for artifacts from the Nile civilizations which date from 4,000 BC to the 4th century. The collection, comprising over 50,000 pieces, is among the world's largest, overviews Egyptian life spanning Ancient Egypt, the Middle Kingdom, the New Kingdom, Coptic art, and the Roman, Ptolemaic, and Byzantine periods.

History
The department's origins lie in the royal collection, but it was augmented by Napoleon's 1798 expeditionary trip with Dominique Vivant, the future director of the Louvre. After Jean-François Champollion translated the Rosetta Stone, Charles X decreed that an Egyptian Antiquities department be created. Champollion advised the purchase of three collections, formed by Edmé-Antoine Durand, Henry Salt and Bernardino Drovet; these additions added 7,000 works. Growth continued via acquisitions by Auguste Mariette, founder of the Egyptian Museum in Cairo. Mariette, after excavations at Memphis, sent back crates of archaeological finds including The Seated Scribe.

Rooms of the Egyptian Antiquities Department
Guarded by the Large Sphinx (c. 2000 BC), the collection is housed in around 30 rooms. Holdings include art, papyrus scrolls, mummies, tools, clothing, jewelry, games, musical instruments, and weapons. Pieces from the ancient period include the Gebel el-Arak Knife from 3400 BC, The Seated Scribe, and the Head of King Djedefre. Middle Kingdom art, "known for its gold work and statues", moved from realism to idealization; this is exemplified by the schist statue of Amenemhatankh and the wooden Offering Bearer. The New Kingdom and Coptic Egyptian sections are deep, but the statue of the goddess Nephthys and the limestone depiction of the goddess Hathor demonstrate New Kingdom sentiment and wealth.

Rooms of the department are as follows:

1. Crypt of the sphinx.
2. Vestibule. 
3. The Nile River. 
4. Field labour. The mastaba. 
5. Animal husbandry, hunting and fishing. 
6. Writing and scribes. 
7. Materials and techniques. 
8. The home and furniture. 
9. Jewels, clothing, and body care. 
10. Leisure: Music and games. 
11. The forecourt of the temple. 
12. The temple. 
13. Crypt of Osiris. The royal tomb. 
14. Sarcophagi. 
15. Mummies, embalming and burial. 
16. Tombs. 
17. The Book of The Dead. L'équipement funéraire. 
18. Gods and magic. 
19. Animals and the gods. 
20. Naqaqa period. The end of prehistory 
21. Thinite period. The first two dynasties. 
22. The Old Kingdom. Seated Scribe. 
23. The Middle Kingdom. 
24. The New Kingdom.
25. The New Kingdom: the period of Akhenaton and Nefertiti. 
26. The New Kingdom: Tutankhamun and his successors. 
27. The New Kingdom: The period of Ramses. 
28. The New Kingdom: The period of Ramses. Princes and courtisans.
29. The Third Intermediate Period. The Saite period. The beginnings of Persian domination. 
30. From the last Egyptian Pharaohs to Cleopatra. The Nectenebos, Alexander the Great, and the Ptolemy dynasty. A: Roman Egypt. B: Coptic Egypt. C: The room Baouit.

Notable artifacts
Notable artifacts are as follows:

Akhenaton and Nefertiti sculpture
Amenophis IV sculpture
Amulet belonging to Paser
Angle harp
Annals of Thutmosis III
Aphrodite Anadyomene 
Bas-relief of Prince Khaemwaset
Apis Bull
Bas-reliefs from the Temple of Satet at Elephantine
Base and feet of a colossus of Amenophis III
Bastet
Bead net for a mummy
Beaker from a cemetery on Sai Island
Body of a Woman sculpture (probably Nefertiti)
Book of mythological images
Bowl of General Djehuty
Byzantine chandelier
Cartonnage of Ankhpakhered
Cat sculpture
A chair from the 18th or 19th dynasty
Chapel of the Tomb of Akhethotep
Chelidona's Coffin
Christ and Abbot Mena
Coffin lid of King Antef
Colossal statue of Rameses II
Comb
Cosmetic spoon
Couple in Wood
Cubit rod
Cupids Picking Grapes
Dagger from Gebel el-Arak
Detachable headrest 
Divine standard 
Door lintel 
Drinking cup in the form of a lotus flower
Eagle censer 
False door on the Stele of Sheshi 
Female Nude statue 
Figurine of a naked woman 
Figurine of a seated woman 
Foundation deposit from the Temple of Deir el-Bahri
Four baboons adoring the rising sun 
Four Ramesses II vases 
Fragment of a funerary shroud, known as "Portrait of Ammonios" 
Fragment of a votive monument 
Fragment of the Book of the Dead 
Fragment of the Hunting Palette 
"Frog" oil lamp
Funerary figurine of Ramesses IV
Funerary furniture of Chancellor Nakhti
Funerary hanging
Funerary statue of a Priestess of Isis
Funerary stele 
Funerary stele of a father  
Funerary stele with two orant figures 
Furniture legs in the form of a nude woman 
Gaia with Cupids 
Game board in the form of a hippo 
Game box in the name of Imenmes 
Gilded cartonnage of the lady Tasheret-pa-ankh 
Great Sphinx of Tanis
Guarded Lion of the Chapel of the Serapeum of Saqqara
Head of a colossal statue of Amenophis III 
Head of a sphinx of King Djedefre 
Hippo figurine 
Hoe 
Horus sculpture
Horus on horseback sculpture
Hypocephalus of Irethorrou 
Imhotep the Wise Deified 
Inventory and accounts from a temple of Abusir
Jar with portrait 
Jonah wall-hanging 
Khabekhent's funerary servant and ushabti chest 
Knucklebones 
Kohl pot in the form of a Nubian porter *Kohl Recipient:the god Bes
Krater
Large bottle with vine-leaf decoration 
Large statue of Chancellor Nakht 
Legging 
Lintel from the tomb of Pairkep 
Mask of a Woman of the 1st century 
Mortuary Mask of Khaemwaset 
Mummy in painted shroud 
Mummy label 
Mummy Mask of the early 12th Dynasty  
Mummy mask of a boy 
Mummy mask of a man with headrest 
Mummy mask of a woman 
Mummy of a man 
Mummy of a woman with portrait 
Mummy shroud and mask 
Mummy's head 
Necklace with fish pendants 
Nile fishing scene 
Nude male statuette
Offering table found at Meroe
Offering-bearer of the 12th Dynasty
Ostrakon with a royal profile 
Paintings from the tomb of Metjetji 
Paintings from the tomb of Unsu 
Pair of clappers 
Pair of sandals 
Palm column of King Unas 
Panel of the Virgin Annunciate 
Panel portrait of a man
Patera 
Pendant of King Osorkon II 
Pendant falcon of Ramesses II 
Pilgrim flasks 
Pillar believed to be from Bawit 
Pinudjem's necklace 
Portraits of men and women
Processional way of sphinxes 
Pyxis or pyx 
Queen Ahmose Nefertari figure
Queen Cleoptrat Making an Offering 
Queen Khenemet-Nefer-Hedjet figurine 
Queen Tiye 
Ram Pendant 
Ramesses II breastplate 
Recipient with bowls 
Reconstruction of a tomb of the cemetery of Deir el-Medina
Red terracotta canopic jars 
Relief from the Temple of Monthu at Tod
Ring of Horemheb 
Ring with horses 
Royal and divine triad 
Royal Sphinx of Pharaoh Achoris 
Sarcophagus box of Ramesses III 
Sarcophagus of Abu Roash 
Sarcophagus of Dioscorides
Sarcophagus of Iniuia 
Scene in the Nile marshes 
Scribe's palette 
Sennerfer's necklace 
Sennefer, the king's head 
Senusret, chief of the treasury 
Shabti of Amenophis III 
Shroud of a child's mummy 
Sistreum of Henuttawy 
Sobek-Re 
Southern Church of Bawit 
Spoon in the form of a bound ibex 
Spoon in the form of a young girl
Sprang cap 
Square of fabric 
St. Menas 
Statue of a priest of Bastet 
Statue of Amenemhetankh 
Statue of Karomana 
Statue of King Nectanebo II 
Statue of Nakhthorheb 
Statue of Osiris 
Statue of Pendua and his father 
Statue of Rakherka 
Statue of the god Bes 
Statue of the goddess Sekhmet 
Statue of Wahibre 
Statue of Sepa and Nesa 
Statuette de femme nue 
Statueette of a young boy 
Statuette of King Ammenemes III 
Statuette of Taharqa 
Statuette of the crocodile-headed god Sobek 
Statuette of Tuy 
Statuette of Isis nursing Horus 
Stele dated to Ramesses II 
Stele of the master craftsman of the 11th Dynasty
Stele of the Serpent King of the 1st Dynasty
Stele of Princess Nefertiabet (4th dynasty) eating 
Tablet of an apprentice scribe 
Tamutnefret's coffins
The four canopic jars of Horesmsaf 
The god Amun protecting Tutankhamun 
The goddess Hathor welcomes Sethos 
The harpist's stele 
The sarcophagus of Madja 
The Scribe Nebmeretef 
The Seated Scribe 
The Tod Treasure 
The Tyre of Constantinople 
The Zodiac of Dendera 
Three cups from the Tod treasure 
Three throwsticks 
Torso of a Ptolemaic King 
Toy 
Tunic of pleated linen 
"Twenty Squares" game board
Two-sided stele of Dedia 
Vase in the form of an ibex 
Vase in the form of the god Bes 
Vase with the name of King Wenis
Wall from a temple of Ramessus II 
Wall of the tomb of Akhetaa 
Wall tile from the 20th Dynasty 
Water jars and stand 
Water pot in the name of the vizier Paser 
Woman in a Cloak statue 
Woman's shroud

References

Departments of the Louvre
Egyptological collections in France